The Greek Catholic Church of Croatia and Serbia, sometimes called, in reference to its Byzantine Rite, the Byzantine Catholic Church of Croatia and Serbia, is a particular (sui iuris) Eastern Catholic church in full communion with the Catholic Church. It consists of the Greek Catholic Eparchy of Križevci, covering Croatia, Slovenia, Bosnia and Herzegovina, and the Greek Catholic Eparchy of Ruski Krstur, covering Serbia. The Eparchy of Križevci was headed by Bishop Nikola Kekić until his retirement in March 2019, and since then the eparchy is governed by apostolic administrator Milan Stipić. The Eparchy of Ruski Krstur is headed by Bishop Đura Džudžar since his appointment in 2003 (until 2018 as Apostolic Exarch).

Although two eparchies are canonically linked, the church has no unified structure, nor an ecclesiastical province of its own, since the Eparchy of Križevci is suffragan to the Latin Church Archdiocese of Zagreb, and the Eparchy of Ruski Krstur is directly subject to the Holy See.

History
Until 2001, the Greek Catholic Eparchy of Križevci had full jurisdiction over all Eastern Catholics of the Byzantine Rite throughout the entire territory of former Yugoslavia, including all of its successor states: Croatia, Slovenia, Bosnia and Herzegovina, Serbia, Montenegro and North Macedonia. During that time, it mostly gathered its faithful among the Croats in central and eastern Croatia, among the Pannonian Rusyns and Ukrainians in eastern Croatia, northern Bosnia and northern Serbia and among Macedonians in North Macedonia.

After the formation of independent successor states from what had been Yugoslavia, the process of administrative reorganization was initiated. In 2001, a separate Greek Catholic Apostolic Exarchate of Macedonia was formed for Greek Catholics in North Macedonia. It was fully separated from the Eparchy of Križevci and proclaimed as directly subject only to the Holy See.

In 2003, a new apostolic exarchate was created for Greek Catholics in Serbia and Montenegro, the Apostolic Exarchate of Serbia and Montenegro. Its first exarch Đura Džudžar (Ђура Џуџар) was appointed in 2003, with residence in Ruski Krstur. This exarchate remained in association with the Eparchy of Križevci.

After those changes, the jurisdiction of the Eparchy of Križevci was confined to Croatia, Slovenia, and Bosnia-Herzegovina.

In 2013, all Catholics of Byzantine Rite in Montenegro were entrusted to the local Latin bishops, so the jurisdiction of Apostolic Exarchate of Serbia and Montenegro was reduced to Serbia only. The Apostolic Exarchate of Serbia was elevated to the Greek Catholic Eparchy of Ruski Krstur in December 2018.

Liturgy and extent
The liturgy is the Slavonic form of Byzantine Rite, using the Old Church Slavonic language and the Cyrillic alphabet.

The Eparchy of Križevci reported for the year 2010 a total of 21,509 faithful (in Croatia, Slovenia, and Bosnia-Herzegovina). At that time, the Apostolic Exarchate for Serbia and Montenegro reported 22,369 faithful.

Gallery

See also
 Catholic Church in Bosnia and Herzegovina
 Catholic Church in Croatia
 Catholic Church in Serbia
 Catholic Church in Slovenia

References

External links

 Eparchy of Križevci 
 Apostolic Exarchate of Macedonia (2001-) on Catholic Hierarchy
 Apostolic Exarchate of Serbia and Montenegro (2003-2013) on Catholic Hierarchy
 Apostolic Exarchate of Serbia (2013-) on Catholic Hierarchy
 Article on Greek Catholics in Former Yugoslavia by Ronald Roberson on the CNEWA web site

 
Eastern Catholicism in Slovenia
Eastern Catholicism in Bosnia and Herzegovina
Eastern Catholicism in Montenegro
Eastern Catholicism in North Macedonia
1611 establishments in Europe
Religious organizations established in the 1610s
17th-century establishments in Croatia